Christmastide is Bob Bennett's eighth album; his second with the Signpost Music label. In this release, Bob captures many of Western Civilization's love/hate relationship with the Christmas season.

Track listing
All songs written by Bob Bennett, except where noted as "(words / music)".

"God with Us" – 4:05
"Brightest and Best" (Reginald Heber / James P. Harding) – 4:07
"Come Thou Not Expected Bossa" (Traditional) – 5:48
"It May Not Have Been December" – 3:41
"Jesus Christ the Apple Tree" (Anonymous / Elizabeth Poston) – 5:36
"The First Noel" (Traditional) – 1:13
"Christmas for Cynics" – 3:12
"Both Things" – 3:25
"Tomorrow Shall Be My Dancing Day" (Traditional / John Gardner) – 2:09
"December MIA" – 4:12
"O Come All Ye Faithful" (Traditional) – 1:24
"I Saw Three Ships" (Traditional - adaptation/arrangement: Bennett) – 2:49
"Carol of the Moon and Stars" – 3:15

Personnel
Bob Bennett – acoustic guitar, electric guitar, vocals, composer
 Roy Salmond – producer, recording, electric guitars, keyboards, percussion (including Egg Cup), Piano, Ukulele, Basses (except for John's three tunes)
 Randall Stoll – drums, percussion (6)
 Brian Thiessen – electric guitar (3)
 Carolyn Arends – background vocals (1)
 Joel Stobbe – cello (9, 13)
 John Patitucci – bass (2, 3, 7)
 Mike Janzen – rhodes (3, 7)
 Larry Nickel – arranged choral vocals (6) and conductor (6, 9)
 Fabiana Katz – choral vocals (6, 9)
 Jennifer McLaren – choral vocals (6, 9)
 John Nickel – choral vocals (6, 9)
 Karen Mang – choral vocals (6, 9)
 Larry Nickel – choral vocals (6, 9)
 Ray Harris – choral vocals (6, 9)

Release history
Christmastide was self-released by the artist in 2009. It is distributed in Canada by Signpost Music.

Reviews
Christianity Today gave the album 4 stars (out of 5) in their November 2009 review; concluding that "Christmastide achieved the twin "Classic" Christmas recording goals of both making light of the season's chaos while ever so poignantly reminding us why we bother to celebrate."

References

External links
 After Seven Years – New Christmas album from Bob Bennett in the works!

Bob Bennett (singer-songwriter) albums
2009 Christmas albums
Christmas albums by American artists